The discography of American electro and hip hop duo LMFAO consists of two studio albums, one extended play, sixteen singles and fifteen music videos. Consisting of rappers and singers Redfoo and SkyBlu, the duo was formed in 2006 in the Los Angeles neighborhood of Pacific Palisades. LMFAO began their career in the Los Angeles club circuit, where they were met with positive reception. American hip hop recording artist will.i.am brought the duo to the attention of industry executive Jimmy Iovine, who signed them to his label Interscope Records.

In July 2008, LMFAO released the EP Party Rock. The following year, their debut studio album of the same name was released; it peaked at number 33 on the US Billboard 200. The album's first single, "I'm in Miami Bitch", peaked at number 51 on the US Billboard Hot 100; the single was more commercially successful in Australia and Canada, becoming a top 40 hit in both countries. "La La La" and "Shots", the album's second and third singles, peaked at numbers 55 and 68 respectively on the Hot 100. The latter single was certified two times platinum by the Recording Industry Association of America (RIAA). The album's fourth single, "Yes", peaked at number 68 in Canada. In 2009, a mashup of "I'm in Miami Bitch" and Dutch DJ Chuckie's 2008 single "Let the Bass Kick" was released, entitled "Let the Bass Kick in Miami Bitch". The single performed well in Europe, becoming a top-ten hit in the United Kingdom.

In 2010, the duo were featured on the song "Gettin' Over You" by French house producer David Guetta. The song became an international hit, topping the charts in France and the United Kingdom as well as reaching the top ten in multiple other countries, including Australia, Ireland and New Zealand. LMFAO released their second studio album Sorry for Party Rocking in June 2011; "Party Rock Anthem" was released as the album's lead single. The song topped the Billboard Hot 100 and also hit number one in countries such as Australia, Canada and the United Kingdom. Fueled by the success of "Party Rock Anthem", Sorry for Party Rocking peaked at number five on the Billboard 200 and earned a gold certification from the RIAA. "Champagne Showers", the album's second single, became a top-ten hit in Australia and New Zealand. "Sexy and I Know It", the album's third single, became LMFAO's second number-one hit on the Billboard Hot 100; it also topped the charts in Australia and Canada. The album's fourth single, "Sorry for Party Rocking", peaked at number 49 on the Billboard Hot 100.

Albums

Studio albums

Extended plays

Singles

As lead artist

As featured artist

Other charted songs

Guest appearances

Music videos

As lead artist

As featured artist

Notes

References

External links
 Official website
 LMFAO at AllMusic
 
 

Discographies of American artists
Electronic music discographies
Hip hop discographies